The 2021 Britcar Endurance Championship (known for sponsorship reasons as the 2021 Goodyear Britcar Endurance Championship) was a motor racing championship for GT cars, touring cars and sportscars held across England. The championship's field consisted of varying types of cars from sportscar to GT and touring cars that competed in four classes, depending on horsepower, momentum, etc. It was the 20th season of a Britcar championship, the 10th run as the Britcar Endurance Championship, and the 1st run as the Goodyear Britcar Endurance Championship. The season began on 24 April at Silverstone Circuit and ended on 14 November at Brands Hatch. This was the first season with the new Praga category, open to all Praga racing cars, which paved the way for a new one-make Praga series in 2022.

Calendar
The first round at Silverstone was initially postponed but rescheduled for 24 April 2021.

Teams and drivers
Cars are assigned classed based on speed, horsepower, momentum, equipment fitted to the car and the car's model;
Praga: Praga racing cars (R1T, R1S)
Class 1: GT3, Sports prototype cars
Class 2: Latest gen Cup; 488 Challenge, cars
Class 3: Older gen cup; 458 Challenge, cars
Class 4: GT4, cup and TCR cars

All teams are British-registered.

Race Results
Bold indicates overall winner.

Overall championship standings

Points are awarded as follows in all classes:

Class championship standings

Points are awarded as follows in all classes:

Notes

References

External links

Britcar
Britcar
Britcar Endurance Championship seasons
Britcar Endurance Championship